Saminathan a/l Ganesan is a Malaysian politician and served as Malacca State Executive Councillor.

Election results

References 

Living people
People from Malacca
Malaysian people of Indian descent
Democratic Action Party (Malaysia) politicians
21st-century Malaysian politicians
Members of the Malacca State Legislative Assembly
Malacca state executive councillors
1985 births